Daniel Diongoli, professionally known as Idyl, is a Nigerian singer, songwriter and recording artist. He is the winner of Season 2 of The Voice Nigeria and is signed to Universal Music, Africa. He is from Bayelsa state in southern Nigeria.

Early career
Idyl auditioned unsuccessfully for four seasons of Project Fame West Africa between 2012 (season five) and 2015 (season nine). He also had unsuccessful auditions on Nigerian Idol (Seasons two through five) and X-Factor Nigeria. In 2016, he released of the song ‘Tari’, for which he won the Next Rated Artiste Award at the Bayelsa Media Awards. In the same year, he also won an award from Roger Hammond Memorial Trust Fund in London; which came with a music scholarship at the Musical Society of Nigeria (MUSON) School of Music, where he learned to play the piano, and studied music theory and vocal training.

In 2017, Idyl auditioned for season two of The Voice Nigeria and was selected by singer Timi Dakolo into his team for the competition. In September 2017, after a 3-month long competition, he was announced as the winner of the reality TV series, ahead of 48 other contestants who qualified for the finals. This was the first ever win for Team Timi Dakolo on the show.

As a result of his win, Idyl received a recording contract with Universal Music Africa, a sports utility vehicle and an all-expense-paid trip to Dubai in the United Arab Emirates.

2017–present
After his win at The Voice Nigeria, Idyl performed at the GAC showcase in Guangzhou, China and he released his debut single on the Universal Music imprint, Better Love. In July 2018, he released Owami, featuring South African singer Lungi Naidoo and produced by Ckay, which enjoyed critical success.
Idly featured another South African artiste, Rowlene Bosman in March 2019 on the song, Satisfy Me, which was described as an edgier sound compared to his earlier releases. Satisfy Me received favourable responses from audiences and months later, he released an ADM remix. In August 2019, he released another single, Iyoro produced by Sovida, which was recorded in his local Ijaw language. The song title translates to ‘Beautiful woman’ in English.

Discography
 Better Love (2018)
 Owami (2018)
 Satisfy Me (2019)
 Satisfy Me – Remix (2019)
 Iyoro (2019)

References 

Living people
Nigerian male singer-songwriters
Nigerian singer-songwriters
Year of birth missing (living people)
The Voice (franchise) winners